Laure Barthélémy (born August 5, 1988, in Briançon, Hautes-Alpes) is a French cross-country skier and soldier who has competed since 2005.

Barthélémy also competed in one Winter Olympics, earning her best finish of fifth in the team sprint event with Karine Laurent Philippot at Vancouver in 2010. She also finished first in the sprint event at the Junior World Ski Championships in Mals in 2008, and second in the 10 km event.

At the FIS Nordic World Ski Championships 2009 in Liberec, she finished 22nd in the individual sprint and 53rd in the 7.5 km + 7.5 km double pursuit. Barthélémy's best World Cup finish was fifth in a team sprint event in Canada in 2009.

Cross-country skiing results
All results are sourced from the International Ski Federation (FIS).

Olympic Games

World Championships

World Cup

Season standings

References

External links
 

1988 births
Living people
People from Briançon
Cross-country skiers at the 2010 Winter Olympics
French female cross-country skiers
Olympic cross-country skiers of France
Université Savoie-Mont Blanc alumni
Sportspeople from Hautes-Alpes
21st-century French women